"Nothing Else Matters" is a 1992 song by Metallica.
Nothing Else Matters may also refer to:
Nothing Else Matters (film), 1920
Nothing Else Matters (album), by Marvin Sapp in 1999
Nothing Else Matters from Glory Days (Little Mix album)
Nothing Else Matters from Louder Than Words (album)